Cichlidogyrus gillesi is a species of monopisthocotylean monogenean in the family Dactylogyridae. It is known to infect Tilapia species, particularly Tilapia guineensis, and was first found in Cameroon. It can be differentiated from its cogenerates by a large and trapezoid heel of the penis, as well as having an S-shaped and wrinkle-walled vagina.

References

Dactylogyridae
Tilapia
Animals described in 2013